Kay Lee Arthur (born November 11, 1933) is Christian author and bible teacher and co-founder of Precept Ministries International.

Early life and education 

Kay Lee Arthur was born on November 11, 1933, in Jackson, Michigan. She grew up in a religious household, which moved frequently.

She graduated from nursing school in 1955 at age 21, and married her first husband, Frank Thomas Goetz, Jr. They got a divorce in 1961. Previously disconnected from her religion, Arthur became newly committed to Christianity in 1963.

Afterwards, she continued nursing and moved to Chattanooga, Tennessee to attend Tennessee Temple University, where she earned a diploma. There, she met Jack Arthur (born March 14, 1926), who had graduated from Tennessee Temple University with a Graduate in Theology in 1956. The couple were married on December 16, 1965 and served as missionaries in Mexico. Medical problems forced them to leave the mission field.

Career

Precept Ministries International 
After returning to Chattanooga, Tennessee, Jack became the station manager of a local Christian radio station, and Kay taught the Bible to teens in their living room.

The Bible study group steadily grew, and a 32-acre farm was purchased to accommodate the expanding ministry, which was named Reach Out Ranch. The radio station was sold in 1972, and Jack became a full-time administrator for the ranch. The ministry's name was eventually changed to Precept Ministries International (PMI).

Kay hosts a daily radio, television and online Bible study teaching program called Precepts for Life, which walks listeners through the Bible using the inductive Bible study method. Precepts for Life reaches an audience of 75 million households and broadcasts to over 30 countries.

In November 2009, Arthur signed an ecumenical statement known as the Manhattan Declaration calling on evangelicals, Catholics and Orthodox Christians not to comply with rules and laws permitting abortion, same-sex marriage and other matters that go against their religious consciences. 

In 2016 Arthur spoke at The Gathering, a religious rally promoting Donald Trump's presidential campaign.

Arthur has spoken at several colleges, including Liberty University in 2015 and Union College in 2017.

Personal life 
Kay has three sons (two from her first marriage, one from her second) and nine grandchildren.

Arthur's husband, Jack, died from Alzheimer's disease in Chattanooga, Tennessee, on January 9, 2017, at age 90.

Publishing 
Since co-founding Precept Ministries International, Kay has written more than 100 books and Bible studies, with over 11 million in print. Her inductive Bible studies are available in over 180 countries in approximately 70 languages.

She has won four Gold Medallion Book Awards for her books A Marriage Without Regrets, The New Inductive Study Bible, His Imprint My Expression, and Lord, I Need Grace to Make It Today.

Selected works 
 Lord, Teach Me to Pray, video teaching series 
 Lord, I Need Grace to Make It Today,(1991) 
 As Silver Refined (1997)
 A Marriage Without Regrets (2001) 
 The New Inductive Study Bible,(2010) 
 His Imprint My Expression 
 How To Study Your Bible,

Awards 
Arthur received a Doctor of Humane Letters from Tennessee Temple University in Chattanooga, Tennessee in 2007.

Arthur was awarded the NRB Hall of Fame Award at the National Religious Broadcasters (NRB) Convention and Exposition in 2011.

References

External links 

 Kay Arthur's Facebook page

1933 births
Living people
20th-century American non-fiction writers
20th-century American women writers
20th-century evangelicals
21st-century American non-fiction writers
21st-century American women writers
21st-century evangelicals
American evangelicals
American television evangelists
American women non-fiction writers
Christians from Tennessee
Evangelical writers
People from Chattanooga, Tennessee
People from Jackson, Michigan
Tennessee Republicans
Writers from Tennessee